These are the singles that reached number one on the Top 100 Singles chart in 1996 as published by Cash Box magazine. Cash Box magazine ceased publication with the November 16, 1996, issue.

See also
 1996 in music
 List of Hot 100 number-one singles of 1996 (U.S.)

References
 https://web.archive.org/web/20110818051829/http://cashboxmagazine.com/archives/90s_files/1996.html

1996
1996 record charts
1996 in American music